Aristophon (lived 4th century BC) was native of the deme of Azenia in Attica. He lived about and after the end of the Peloponnesian War. In 412 BC, Aristophon, Laespodias, and Melesias were sent to Sparta as ambassadors by the oligarchical government of the Four Hundred. 

In the archonship of Euclid in 404, after Athens was delivered of the Thirty Tyrants, Aristophon proposed a law which, though said to be beneficial to the republic, yet caused great uneasiness and troubles in many families at Athens; for it ordained that no one should be regarded as a citizen of Athens whose mother was not a freeborn woman. He also proposed various other laws, by which he acquired great popularity and the full confidence of the people. Their great number may be inferred from his own statement that he was accused 75 times of having made illegal proposals, but that he had always come off victorious. His influence with the people is most manifest from his accusation of Iphicrates and Timotheus, two men to whom Athens was much indebted. He charged them in 354 with having accepted bribes from the Chians and Rhodians, and the people condemned Timotheus on the mere assertion of Aristophon. 

After this event, but still in 354, he came forward in the assembly to defend the law of Leptines against Demosthenes. The latter, who often mentions him, treats the aged Aristophon with great respect, and reckons him among the most eloquent orators. This event is the last record of Aristophon, and he seems to have died soon after. No record of his orations has come down to us.

Notes

References
 

5th-century BC Athenians
4th-century BC Athenians
5th-century BC births
4th-century BC deaths
Ancient Greek rhetoricians